James Edward Pugh (born November 12, 1950) is an American trombonist and composer. He was a trombonist with Woody Herman (1972–1976) and briefly with Chick Corea before concentrating on session work.

Early life
Pugh was born in Butler, Pennsylvania, on November 12, 1950. Pugh began playing the trombone around the age of ten. He attended the Eastman School of Music from 1968 to 1972, where he played in an ensemble under Chuck Mangione.

Later life and career
Pugh toured and recorded with the Woody Herman Band for four years from 1972, and briefly performed with Chick Corea in 1977. He then concentrated on studio session work for jazz and popular musicians. In 1984, he was co-leader for the album The Pugh–Taylor Project. He also composed for and played on the album X Over Trombone.

Discography
Solo

 1981: Crystal Eyes (Pewter)
 1984: The Pugh /Taylor Project  (DMP)
 2001: Pugh Mosso
 2002: E'nJ "Legend and Lion" with Eijiro Nakagawa Japanese release
 2004: Echano
 2004: E2'nJ2 (TNC)
 2006: E'nJ Just Us
 2007: X Over Trombone (Albany)
 2007: Holly and the Ivy 
 2012: The Devil's Hopyard (Jazzmaniac)
 2012: Pugh Taylor II (Pewter)

As sideman
 1972: Giant Steps,  Woody Herman
 1973: Thundering Herd, Woody Herman
 1976: The 40th Anniversary Concert,  Woody Herman
 1977: Musicmagic,  Chick Corea and Return to Forever
 1977: Return to Forever – Live,  Chick Corea
 1978: Secret Agent,  Chick Corea
 1979: In a Temple Garden (CTI, 1979)  Yusef Lateef
 1988: The Disney Album,  Barbara Cook
 1989: When Harry Met Sally...,  Harry Connick, Jr.
 1990: Big Boss Band,  George Benson
 1992: League of Their Own,  James Taylor
 1993: What Headphones?, André Previn
 1994: Mr. Gentle Mr. Cool,  David "Fathead" Newman
 1994: Scampi Fritti,  Marc Beacco
 1995: Honey and Rue, with Kathleen Battle; St. Luke's Orchestra, André Previn, conductor
 1995: Leave Your Mind Behind, With the Joe Roccisano Orchestra
 1995: Rush Hour, with Joe Lovano; Gunther Schuller, conductor
 1996: Two Lane Highways,  Jay Leonhart and Friends
 1999: Crossing the Bridge,  Eileen Ivers
 1999: Songs from the Last Century,  George Michael
 2000: Eight,  Walter Blanton
 2000: Two Against Nature, Steely Dan
 2002: Looking for America, Carla Bley
 2003: Alegría, Wayne Shorter
 2003: Everything Must Go Steely Dan
 2006: Morph the Cat, Donald Fagen
 2007: This Meets That, John Scofield
 1989–present Manhattan Jazz Orchestra 
 1998–present Super Trombone
 2012: Sunken Condos, Donald Fagen
 2020: Joy Road Volume 6, University of Illinois Concert Jazz Band

Broadway Recordings
 1979 Sweeney Todd
 1992 City of Angels
 1995 Will Rogers' Follies
 1998 Victor/Victoria
 2000 Fosse

Motion picture soundtracks (featured soloist)
 League Of Their Own
 Meet Joe Black
 The Birdcage
 Brighton Beach Memoirs
 Shining Through
 Biloxi Blues

Classical (not as soloist)
 Mass, Charles Wuorinen
 Ponder Nothing, The Chamber Music of Ben Johnston, Music Amici
 The Music of Irwin Bazelon
 Collage – New York Trombone Quartet
 Bright Sheng: Lacerations, 92nd St. Y Orchestra, Gerard Schwartz, conductor
 EOS Orchestra 
 Concordia Orchestra
 The Silk Road Project with YoYo Ma
 The Graham Ashton Brass Ensemble Plays the Music of James Pugh and Daniel Schnyder, Graham Ashton Brass Ensemble

References

External links
 Jim Pugh at Trombone Page of the World
 NPR's Top 10 Classical Albums of 2008

1950 births
Living people
Musicians from Camden, New Jersey
People from Butler, Pennsylvania
American trombonists
Male trombonists
American film score composers
American male film score composers
Composers for trombone
Return to Forever members
Musicians from Pennsylvania
Eastman School of Music alumni
University of Illinois Urbana-Champaign faculty
21st-century trombonists
21st-century American male musicians